Kenyazomus is a monotypic genus of hubbardiid short-tailed whipscorpions, first described by Luis de Armas in 2014. Its single species, Kenyazomus pekkai is distributed in Kenya.

References 

Schizomida genera
Monotypic arachnid genera